The 2021–22 Championnat National A is the 67th season of the Championnat National A, the highest basketball league in Tunisia. The regular season started on 25 September 2021 and ended on 10 May 2022.

US Monastir won its seventh league title; it was its fourth straight victorious season.

Teams
This season featured 10 teams, with SS Sfaxien and US Anar joining the league as newcomers.

Foreign players
The following foreign players played with the Championnat National A teams this season:

Regular season
The regular season started on 25 September 2021. The six highest placed teams advance to the play-offs, while the bottom four teams will play in the play-out.

Relegation round

Play-offs
In the play-offs, the six highest ranked team from the regular season play against each other. The highest four teams advance to the Super play-offs.

Super play-offs
The Super play-offs began on 14 April 2022. Numbers in brackets denote the team's seed.

Play-out
The last team in the play-out is relegated directly to the Nationale B. The three other teams play in the Super play-out.

Winning roster
US Monastir 2021–22 roster
 Coach : Miodrag Perišić
 Players : Neji Jaziri, Oussama Marnaoui, Radhouane Slimane, Mohamed Rassil, Firas Lahyani, Mohamed Abbassi, Wassef Methnani, Mokhtar Ghyaza, Michael Dixon, Solo Diabate, Houssem Mhamli

References

Tunisian Division I Basketball League

Tunisia